The name Edwina is a feminine form of the male name Edwin, which derives from Old English and means "rich friend." Edwin was a popular name until the time of the Norman Conquest, then fell out of favour until Victorian times.

People
Edwina Bartholomew (born 1983), Australian journalist
Edwina Benner (1885–1955), American politician
Edwina Bone (born 1988), Australian field hockey player
Edwina Booth (1909–1991), American actress
Edwina Brown (born 1978), American former basketball player and current college assistant coach
Edwina Chamier (1890–1981), Canadian Alpine skiing Olympic champion
Edwina Cornish, Australian biologist
Edwina Currie (born 1946), British writer, broadcaster and former Member of Parliament
Edwina P. Dalton (born 1936), American politician
Edwina Eustis Dick (1908–1997), American contralto
Edwina Dumm (1910–2007), American comic strip artist
Edwina Dunn (born 1958), English entrepreneur
Edwina Hume Fallis (1876–1957), American educator, writer, toy designer
Edwina Findley (born 1980), American actress
Edwina Garcia (born 1944), American politician
Edwina Grima (born 1969), Maltese judge
Lady Edwina Louise Grosvenor (born 1981), British prison reformer
Edwina Hart (born 1957), Welsh Assembly Minister for Social Justice
Edwina Hayes (born 1973), English singer-songwriter
Edwina Keane (born 1990), Irish camogie player
Edwina Kennedy (born 1959), Australian golfer
Edwina Kruse (1848–1930), American educator
Edwina Lau (born 1965), Hong Kong police officer
Edwina McGrail (born 1950), Welsh artist
Edwina Donnelly Mitchell (1894–1968), American lawyer and prison superintendent
Edwina Mountbatten (1901–1960), English heiress and wife of Admiral Louis Mountbatten
Edwina Palmer (born 1955), Japanese associate professor
Edwina Pettway (born 1950), American artist
Edwina Pio, New Zealand academic
Edwina Rogers (born 1964), American agnostic
Edwina Sandys (born 1938), British artist
Edwina Spicer (born 1948), Zimbabwean journalist
Edwina Stewart (1934–2020), Northern Irish communist and civil-rights activist
Edwina Tops-Alexander (born 1974), Australian equestrian rider
Edwina von Gal, American landscaper
Edwina Whitney (1868–1970), American librarian
Edwina Florence Wills (1915–2002), American artist

Fictional characters
Edwina, an animated character in the television series My Friend Rabbit, played by Stacey DePass

Edwina Brown, in the film National Velvet (1944), played by Angela Lansbury
Edwina Chicken, a minor character in the film Chicken Run (2000)
Edwina Cutwater, in the film All of Me (1984), played by Lily Tomlin 
Edwina Ferguson, in the M*A*S*H episode "Edwina"
Edwina Fulton, in the movie Monkey Business played by Ginger Rogers (1952)
Edwina Lewis, on the soap opera One Life to Live
Edwina Lionheart, played by Diana Rigg in the film Theatre of Blood
Edwina "Ed" McDunnough, in the movie Raising Arizona, played by Holly Hunter
Edwina Moira, in the Thief computer game series
Edina Monsoon, born Edwina, the main character of the BBC television series Absolutely Fabulous played by Jennifer Saunders
Edwina Richese, in the novel Dune: House Atreides
Edwina Spoonapple, in the musical Dear Edwina
Edwina Winston, on The Simpsons (former lover of Abraham Simpson)
Edwina Sharma, on Bridgerton played by Charithra Chandran

English feminine given names